In 2000, there were 26 This American Life episodes.

Act 1: So a Jew, a Christian, and a Recording Crew Walk into This Bar
Act 2: Matching Outfits Not Included
Act 3: The Artist Formerly Known as Dr. Sarkin

The TAL production staff interviewed patrons at the Golden Apple Diner in Chicago during one 24-hour period. This episode consists of vignettes of these interviews connected by Ira Glass's narration. If you are in Chicago, Ira recommends the diner's feta cheese omelette.

Act 1: Self-Deception
Act 2: Deceiving Others
Act 3: Accidental Deception – David Sedaris performs a version of his story "Picka Pocketoni," from his collection Me Talk Pretty One Day

External links
This American Lifes radio archive for 2000

2000
This American Life
This American Life